Mick Donnellan (born c. 1980) is an Irish playwright, noir novelist, screenwriter, creative writing teacher and journalist.

Profile
Donnellan completed an MA in Writing at NUI Galway in 2004. Since then he has worked as a novelist, journalist, travel writer, teacher and playwright. He completed his first novel El Niño in 2005. He left Ireland soon after and went on to live in Spain, Australia and Canada. While traveling he worked as a travel writer and journalist, and co-founded the arts paper Urban Pie in Vancouver. Upon returning to Ireland he went on to work with Druid (2009) and RTE (2010).

Later, he established a theatre company Truman Town Theatre, whose plays are written, directed, and produced by Donnellan. Donnellan's plays for the company include Sunday Morning Coming Down, Shortcut to Hallelujah, which became known as the Ballinrobe Trilogy.

Donnellan's play El Niño was published in 2012, and Donnellan is currently in negotiations to sell the film rights.

The company toured a fourth play, Velvet Revolution, which created interest in Donnellan's work among the film industry. His fifth play Radio Luxembourg was immediately optioned by London film company Dixon/ Baxi/ Evans and adapted as Tiger Raid for the screen.

Donnellan's second novel "Fisherman’s Blues" enjoyed positive reviews, and Donnellan was employed as a joint-screenwriter on the Tiger Raid  project alongside writers Simon Dixon and Gareth Coulam Evans. The film was made in the Jordanian desert. Tiger Raid was directed by Dixon, and stars Brian Gleeson, Damian Molony and Sofia Boutella. It was accepted into the Tribeca Film Festival, Cannes  and Edinburgh, and the Irish Premiere was screened at the Galway Film Fleadh.

Most recently, Donnellan completed work on the screen adaptation of his play Shortcut to Hallelujah with Florence Films. The screenplay is titled Sam and is based on  a gypsy curse supposedly set on an Irish football side.

In May 2019 his third novel was published. It was called Mokusatsu.

Donnellan also lectures in drama and theatre at NUI Galway, and adult evening classes in creative writing at the AIT (Athlone Institute of Technology) in County Westmeath.

Works

Books
 El Niño
 Fisherman's Blues (2014)
 Mokusatsu (sequel to El Niño) (2019)

Plays
 Sunday Morning Coming Down
 Shortcut to Hallelujah
 Gun Metal Grey
 Velvet Revolution
 Radio Luxembourg

Screenplays/produced films 

Tiger Raid (adapted from ''Radio Luxembourg") (2016)

References

External links
 http://www.mickdonnellan.com
 http://www.irishplayography.com/person.aspx?personid=18155
 http://www.advertiser.ie/galway/article/50290/mick-donnellan-brewing-up-a-storm-with-el-nio
 https://archive.today/20130217233213/http://www.galwaynews.ie/24390-mick%E2%80%99s-debut-novel-crime-and-love-finally-sees-light-day
 http://www.dixonbaxievans.com
 https://open.spotify.com/album/6fqSZwvHnBFe25MQVJ0yFD?si=WKy9g5dxT1izzvJvbwECqw

People from County Mayo
People from County Galway
Irish dramatists and playwrights
Irish male dramatists and playwrights
Living people
Irish novelists
1980s births
Alumni of the National University of Ireland
Irish male novelists